Sam Schwartz may refer to:

Sam Schwartz a.k.a. Gridlock Sam
Samm Schwartz, American comic artist
Samuel Schwartz (racewalker)

See also
Samuel Schwarz (disambiguation)